Mark Monero (born  1968) is a British actor and musician. He has had various roles including parts in Babylon, Wilt, Prayer for the Dying, Sid and Nancy and remains best known for his role as Steve Elliot in the BBC soap opera EastEnders (1991–96), although he has appeared in many other television and theatre roles.

Early life
Born in London, England to Afro-Caribbean parents, Monero began acting when introduced to Anna Scher's theatre school in Islington in the late 1970s.

Career
One of Monero's earliest roles was in the seminal 1980s film Babylon, in which he plays the brother of Brinsley Ford's character "Blue".  Monero started with some early roles in TV serials such as Play for Today (1980), Bless Me Father (1981) and a role in the BBC children's programme Grange Hill (1983). He later went on to secure the role of Woody in the popular detective series Lovejoy (1986). Later he had a role in Dempsey and Makepeace (1986) and a part in the film Sid and Nancy, a biography of punk rocker Sid Vicious from the Sex Pistols.  During this period Monero also appeared as part of the comedy duo Shift and Zed with Gary Beadle, in Smiley Cultures Club Mix programme.

He later became the character of Steve Elliot in EastEnders (1991–96), starring alongside Michelle Gayle, who played his love-interest Hattie Tavernier.

Monero's other credits include The Lenny Henry Show (1988), Young, Gifted and Broke (1989), The Bill (1985; 1988; 2001; 2009). He starred in the BBC comedy Gimme Gimme Gimme (2001) — where he played the long-lost son of Linda, played by Kathy Burke — Casualty (2002), Judge John Deed (2005), Waking The Dead (2005) and Doctors (2006). He also played the rapping father of musician, Jal, in E4's teen drama Skins (2007). Monero also had a role in the BBC Asian Network soap opera Silver Street and appeared in science fiction programme Doctor Who. Recently he played role of Caesar in the Indian dance film Mad About Dance .

Mark also has appeared in The Chemical Brothers Further'' visuals, as he appeared in the song "Escape Velocity". He also appeared in the visuals for the live versions of "Hey Boy Hey Girl" and "Do It Again".

Monero has acted in numerous plays and is an accomplished stage actor.

He composes and plays music for both himself and as part of the band North Of Ping Pong . Monero has also, in parallel, been active in producing, writing and performing his own music since his early years.

External links 

 BBC interview with Mark Monero

References

English male soap opera actors
Alumni of the Anna Scher Theatre School
Black British male actors
Living people
1968 births
British people of Grenadian descent